Radomice  is a village in the administrative district of Gmina Lipno, within Lipno County, Kuyavian-Pomeranian Voivodeship, in north-central Poland.

During the occupation of Poland (World War II), on October 8, 1939, the Germans carried out a massacre of 23 Polish farmers and farm workers from Radomice and Bobrowniki in the village (see also Nazi crimes against the Polish nation).

References

Radomice